Protochnoye is a rural locality (a selo) and the administrative center of Protochensky Selsoviet, Limansky District, Astrakhan Oblast, Russia. The population was 610 as of 2010. There are 3 streets.

Geography 
Protochnoye is located 33 km northeast of Liman (the district's administrative centre) by road. Zarechnoye is the nearest rural locality.

References 

Rural localities in Limansky District